Christina Mathilda Staël von Holstein (1876–1953) was a Swedish lawyer. She was the second woman to become a lawyer in Sweden, the first being Eva Andén. She was known as a feminist throughout her lifetime.

Biography

She was born in Kristianstad as the daughter of the nobleman and Colonel Axel Staël von Holstein and Cecilia Nordenfeldt and grew up in Värmland. She was orphaned early and left with responsibility for her eleven siblings, and never married.

She was a correspondent at a law firm, then an assistant and an accountant at the Stockholm City Health Board. She became a Candidate of Law in Stockholm in 1918. She was also a member of the Fredrika Bremer Association and chairman of the Stockholm Women's Association. From 1919 to 1923 she was a partner in Eva Andén's law firm. As a lawyer, she primarily worked on family law and property issues.

One of the biggest problems for women to obtain government office during this time was that the law defined the applicant for such jobs as a "Swedish man". The Ministry of Justice formed a committee in 1919 to investigate and remove this barrier from the law through a change of constitution. The chairman of the committee was Emilia Broomé, the first woman to chair a government committee. Staël von Holstein was a committee member. The committee's work resulted in the Competence Law of 1923.

Staël von Holstein was awarded the Illis quorum by the King of Sweden in 1946.

She died in Stockholm.

See also
 Anna Pettersson, Swedish lawyer

Sources

Further reading
 

1876 births
Swedish women lawyers
1953 deaths
Swedish women's rights activists
20th-century Swedish lawyers